Joseph Patrick Cannavino (born January 20, 1935) was an American and Canadian football player who played for the Hamilton Tiger-Cats, Oakland Raiders and Buffalo Bills. He won the Grey Cup with the Tiger-Cats in 1963. He went to Collinwood high-school in Ohio. He played college football at Ohio State University and was drafted in the 1957 NFL draft by the Baltimore Colts (Round 16, #185 overall).

References

1935 births
Living people
Players of American football from Cleveland
Players of Canadian football from Cleveland
American football defensive backs
Ohio State Buckeyes football players
Oakland Raiders players
Buffalo Bills players
American Football League players
Canadian football defensive backs
Hamilton Tiger-Cats players